The 2013 season of the 3. divisjon, the fourth highest association football league for men in Norway.

Between 22 and 26 games (depending on group size) are played in 12 groups, with 3 points given for wins and 1 for draws. Twelve group winners are promoted to the 2. divisjon.

Tables

Group 1

Group 2

Group 3

Group 4

Group 5

Group 6

Group 7

Group 8

Group 9

Group 10

Group 11

Group 12

References
NIFS

Norwegian Third Division seasons
4
Norway
Norway